Pherne sperryi is a species of geometrid moth in the family Geometridae. It is found in North America.

The MONA or Hodges number for Pherne sperryi is 6951.

References

Further reading

 

Ourapterygini
Articles created by Qbugbot
Moths described in 1935